Big Bad Luck Pond is a lake located east of Indian Lake, New York. Fish species present in the lake are largemouth bass, northern pike, white sucker, rock bass, black bullhead, yellow perch, and pumpkinseed sunfish. There is a carry down on trail off Route 28 on the northeast corner.

References

Lakes of New York (state)
Lakes of Hamilton County, New York